San Benito Consolidated Independent School District is a public school district based in San Benito, Texas, United States.  It was formed on April 26, 1952 via the merger of the San Benito Independent School District and the Rangerville Independent School District.

In addition to San Benito, the district serves the incorporated towns of Los Indios and Rangerville, as well as the unincorporated communities of El Camino Angosto, Encantada-Ranchito El Calaboz, La Paloma, and Lago. A small portion of Harlingen also lies within the district.

In 2009, the school district was rated "academically acceptable" by the Texas Education Agency.

Schools
High schools
 San Benito High School
 San Benito Veterans Memorial Academy

Middle schools
 Berta Cabaza Middle School
 Miller Jordan Middle School
 San Benito Riverside Middle School

Elementary Schools
 Fred Booth Elementary School
 Dr. C.M. Cash Elementary School
 Judge Oscar De La Fuente Elementary School
 Ed Downs Elementary School
 Dr. Raul Garza Jr. Elementary School
 Landrum Elementary School (closed 2018)
 La Encantada Elementary School
 La Paloma Elementary School
 Angela G. Leal Elementary School
 Frank Roberts Elementary School
 Rangerville Elementary School
 Sullivan Elementary School

References

External links
 

School districts in Cameron County, Texas